Pelegrina proterva is a species of jumping spider. It is mainly found in the eastern United States and Canada, but has been reported as far west as British Columbia and Montana. Males range from 3.3 to 4.2 mm in body length. Females range from 4.4 to 5.6 mm.

References

External links

 

Salticidae
Articles created by Qbugbot
Spiders described in 1837